Kamal Shrestha (born 10 July 1997) is a Nepalese professional footballer who plays as a defender for Manang Marshyangdi Club and the Nepal national team.

Career

Manang Marshyangdi Club

Suffering an injury, one of the tribulations of being a footballer, in the 2018 2nd Far West Gold Cup quarter-final against Rupandehi XI, Shrestha was forced to miss the semifinal versus Nepal Army Club as a result and had to undergo dental surgery. Kamal is also the present captain of Manang Marsyangdi Club.

References

External links 
 

Association football defenders
Manang Marshyangdi Club players
Living people
Nepalese footballers
Nepal international footballers
Footballers at the 2018 Asian Games
1997 births
Asian Games competitors for Nepal